Paul Hanley and Kevin Ullyett were the defending champions, but lost in the semifinals to Arnaud Clément and Michaël Llodra.

Jonas Björkman and Max Mirnyi won in the final 6–4, 6–4, against Arnaud Clément and Michaël Llodra.

Seeds

Draw

Draw

External links
Draw

Doubles